The 2019–20 season was Vojvodina's 105th season in existence and the club's 14th competing in the Serbian SuperLiga.

Transfers

In

Out

Pre-season and friendlies

Competitions

Serbian SuperLiga

Regular season

League table

Results by matchday

Results

Serbian Cup

Statistics

Squad statistics 

|-
! colspan=14 style="background:red; color:white; text-align:center;"| Goalkeepers

|-
! colspan=14 style="background:red; color:white; text-align:center;"| Defenders

|-
! colspan=14 style="background:red; color:white; text-align:center;"| Midfielders

|-
! colspan=14 style="background:red; color:white; text-align:center;"| Forwards

|-
! colspan=14 style="background:red; color:white; text-align:center;"| Players transferred out during the season
|-

Goal scorers 

Last updated: 1 July 2020

Clean sheets 

Last updated: 1 July 2020

Disciplinary record 

Last updated: 1 July 2020

Game as captain 

Last updated: 1 July 2020

References 

FK Vojvodina seasons
Serbian football clubs 2019–20 season